Alexis Flores (born July 18, 1975) is a Honduran fugitive, murderer and child rapist wanted for the kidnapping, rape and murder of five-year-old Iriana DeJesus in Philadelphia, Pennsylvania, US, in 2000. Flores is the 487th fugitive to be placed on the  FBI's Ten Most Wanted Fugitives list.

Background 
Flores was born in Honduras in 1975, although he has used dates of birth ranging from 1975 to 1982. Flores has a large surgical scar on his neck as a result of an injury sustained in Hurricane Mitch in Honduras in 1998.

Kidnapping and murder charges 
In summer 2000, a homeless drifter known as "Carlos" (or "Carlo") had been given shelter, clothing and work as a handyman by Hunting Park, Philadelphia, resident Jorge Contreras. On August 3, five days after being reported missing, the body of five-year-old Iriana DeJesus was found in the basement of an empty apartment building where "Carlos" is believed to have stayed. She had been sexually assaulted, strangled and wrapped in a trash bag. A T-shirt bearing a distinct political logo was found near Iriana's body with her blood on it. When police questioned Contreras about the shirt, he recognized it as one of the articles of clothing he had lent to "Carlos," who had not been seen in the area since the girl was reported missing. "Carlos" then became wanted for questioning and a sketch of him was profiled on America's Most Wanted.

Arrests and deportation 
Flores was arrested for shoplifting in Arizona in 2002. Two years later, police came to Flores' residence in response to a noise complaint. After giving fraudulent identity documents to police, Flores was arrested for possession of a forgery device, a felony in Arizona. When he was arrested, Flores had a welcoming demeanor, was friendly, and cooperated with the police during questioning. Upon entering his apartment for further investigation, officers noticed pornography spread out across the floors. Flores told immigration officials that he had lived in Schaumburg, Illinois, prior to living in Phoenix. He was incarcerated for 60 days and deported to Honduras after his release in June 2005.

DNA match and addition to FBI Ten Most Wanted Fugitives 
In 2006, Flores' DNA sample taken in Arizona was added to the Combined DNA Index System. In March 2007, his DNA sample positively matched DNA found at the crime scene in Philadelphia. It has been determined that "Carlos" and Flores are the same person.

On March 22, 2007, a local arrest warrant was issued in the Commonwealth of Pennsylvania, and Flores was charged with murder and various other felonies. On the same date, a federal arrest warrant for Flores was issued in the Eastern District of Pennsylvania, and he was charged with unlawful flight to avoid prosecution.

Flores was added to the FBI's Top Ten Most Wanted Fugitives list on June 2, 2007. He replaced Shauntay Henderson on the list. There is a reward of up to $100,000 for information leading directly to Flores' capture offered by the FBI. He is also the subject of an Interpol Red Notice. He is considered armed and extremely dangerous. Flores is fluent in Spanish and English, and is believed to be either in his native Honduras or to have returned to the United States.

See also 
 List of fugitives from justice who disappeared

References

External links 
 Flores' FBI Top 10 Most Wanted Fugitive Alert
 Flores' profile on America's Most Wanted
 FBI press release announcing Flores' addition to the list

1975 births
2000s missing person cases
2000 murders in the United States
Criminals from Philadelphia
FBI Ten Most Wanted Fugitives
Forgers
Fugitives wanted on murder charges
Fugitives wanted on kidnapping charges
Homeless people
Honduran criminals
Honduran emigrants to the United States
People deported from the United States
People from Phoenix, Arizona
Living people